James John Cominsky (July 28, 1918 – February 7, 2003) was an American professional basketball player. He played for the Rochester Royals in the National Basketball League for one season and averaged 0.8 points per game. Cominsky also played for the Grand Rapids Rangers in the Professional Basketball League of America.

References

1918 births
2003 deaths
American men's basketball players
Basketball players from Chicago
DePaul Blue Demons men's basketball players
Guards (basketball)
Professional Basketball League of America players
Rochester Royals players
United States Navy personnel of World War II